12N may refer to:

 Aeroflex–Andover Airport, by FAA airport identification code
 12th parallel north, a line of latitude
 Nitrogen-12 (12N), an isotope of nitrogen

See also
 N12 (disambiguation)